Saša Urošević (born 26 January 1999) is a Croatian football player who plays for Ližnjan.

Career
He made his professional debut in the Croatian First Football League for NK Istra 1961 on 17 February 2017, in a game against NK Lokomotiva. 

In the summer of 2018 he left the club for third-tier NK Novigrad. In July 2019, he joined NK Rudar Labin.

References

External links
 
 

1999 births
Living people
Sportspeople from Pula
Association football midfielders
Croatian footballers
NK Istra 1961 players
NK Novigrad players
NK Rudar Labin players
Croatian Football League players